Giannis Kiakos (born 14 February 1998) is a Greek professional footballer who plays as a left-back for Super League club PAS Giannina.

References

1998 births
Living people
Citizens of Greece through descent
Greek footballers
Greek expatriate footballers
German people of Greek descent
Sportspeople of Greek descent
Regionalliga players
Gamma Ethniki players
Super League Greece players
SpVgg Bayreuth players
Panionios F.C. players
Volos N.F.C. players
Ionikos F.C. players
PAS Giannina F.C. players
Greek expatriate sportspeople in Germany
Association football defenders
Sportspeople from Bamberg